Maskinongé is a municipality in the Mauricie region of the province of Quebec in Canada.

References

External links
 

Incorporated places in Mauricie
Municipalities in Quebec
Canada geography articles needing translation from French Wikipedia